Stevenson is a station on the Port Authority of Allegheny County's light rail network, located in Dormont, Pennsylvania. The street level stop is located in a highly populated residential area that features many medium density multi-unit facilities. It serves commuters within walking distance, providing access toward Downtown Pittsburgh or South Hills Village.

References

External links 

Port Authority T Stations Listings

Port Authority of Allegheny County stations
Railway stations in the United States opened in 1987
Red Line (Pittsburgh)